El edificio de enfrente is a Mexican telenovela produced by Augusto Elías and Antulio Jimenez Pons  for Televisión Independiente de México in 1972.

Cast 
Ignacio López Tarso - Arturo
Susana Alexander - Carolina
Julio Aldama
Luis Aragón
Fernanda Ayensa - Dorita
Rafael Baledón
Susana Dosamantes - Celia
July Furlong
Octavio Galindo
Queta Lavat
Nelly Meden
Oscar Morelli
Germán Robles
Emma Roldán - Lupe
Enrique Álvarez Félix
Alfredo W. Barrón
José Baviera
Verónica Castro - Carmen
Edith González - Martha
María Rojo - María Luz

References

External links 

Mexican telenovelas
1972 telenovelas
Televisa telenovelas
Spanish-language telenovelas
1972 Mexican television series debuts
1972 Mexican television series endings